Kawarthas Northumberland is a branded tourism area of Ontario that is officially designated as Regional Tourism Organization 8 (RTO8). RTO8 was created through the Tourism Competitiveness Study completed in 2009 and is funded by the Ministry of Tourism and Culture (MCTS) to support a competitive and sustainable tourism industry, attract visitors, generate economic activity, and create jobs within the region that encompasses: City of Kawartha Lakes, the City and County of Peterborough, and the County of Northumberland.

External links
 Official site

Organizations based in Ontario